Yakakent is the central town of Yakakent district in Samsun Province of Turkey, located on the Black Sea coast.

Sister cities 
Yakakent has one sister city: 
 Kushimoto (Japan)

References

Populated places in Samsun Province
Fishing communities in Turkey
Populated coastal places in Turkey
Districts of Samsun Province